Lydia Lazarov (born January 16, 1946) is an Israeli former yachting world champion.

Biography
Lazarov is Jewish, and was born in Sofia, Bulgaria.

Yachting career
Lazarov and Zefania Carmel were teammates in the Zevulun Sailing Club in Bat Yam, Israel. They won the 1966 Israeli 420-class national championship.

Lazarov and Carmel also won the 1969 world title in the Team 420 Sailing Class, at Sandhem, Sweden, where other 64 boats from 16 countries competed. They were the first world champions in any sport representing Israel. Next year, at the World Championships held in Tel Aviv in 1970, Lazarov won the title of world champion in singles in the 420 class, and finished in doubles (along with Zefania Carmel) in fifth place.

Lazarov was inducted into the International Jewish Sports Hall of Fame in 1992.

See also
Sports in Israel
List of select Jews in sailing

References

1946 births
Israeli people of Bulgarian-Jewish descent
Israeli female sailors (sport)
Jewish sailors (sport)
Bulgarian emigrants to Israel
Living people